Dr. Kelly J. Dixon is an Associate Professor of Archaeology at the University of Montana and a member of the College of Arts And Sciences at UM. Her main area of work is the American West, and she is perhaps best known for her work with the Donner Party site, as well as research into saloons in Virginia City, Nevada.

Education
Kelly Dixon attended the University of Minnesota at Duluth, majoring in anthropology.  She went on to receive her Master of Science in Industrial Archaeology at Michigan Technological University in 1995 and her Doctorate in Anthropology at the University of Nevada in Reno.  While at the University of Nevada she worked on her dissertation based on the archaeology of an African American saloon with Donald Hardesty.

Research
Dixon's particular field of interest is the historical archaeology of the American West and in other settings where cultures from various parts of the world came into contact. Between 1997 and 2002 she conducted projects in Virginia City, Nevada and the Comstock Mining District while working for the Nevada State Historic Preservation Office at the Comstock Archaeology Center.

Dixon has also done extensive work on the Donner Party site, continuing the work done by Hardesty in the late 1980s and early 1990s. In 2003, in conjunction with researchers from the University of Oregon, a production company affiliated with the Discovery Channel sponsored work there. This resulted in the show Unsolved History: The Donner Party. Her team found numerous artifacts including ceramics, pieces of a lantern, writing slate, mirror fragments, glass from a medicine bottle, and musket balls. She returned in the summer of 2004 for five weeks to carry an excavation with her colleagues that was funded by various universities, a local foundation, and eventually, for part of the lab analysis, a production company affiliated with the History Channel. Dixon and colleagues were not just concerned with the topic of cannibalism and whether it may have occurred at the Donner Party's Alder Creek camp, but what the individuals living in that camp endured and what, in general, humans do, or how they adapt, when faced desperate circumstances. The combined historical and archaeological evidence indicated that cannibalism did take place but not until the last few weeks. The History Channel aired the thirty-minute segment on the Donner Party in the spring of 2006 as part of a documentary on cannibalism.

Dixon is currently developing student-oriented multidisciplinary archaeological research at the mining ghost town of Coloma, Montana. and at isolated Chinese mining communities in Western Montana She currently serves as the editor for the Society for Historical Archaeology website.

Publications
 Boomtown Saloons: Archaeology and History in Virginia City, University of Nevada Press, 2005.

Notes

External links
Society for Historical Archeology
Donner Party Archaeology Project
Unsolved History Season 2 - Episode 6: Donner Party

Living people
Historians of the American West
University of Minnesota Duluth alumni
Women historians
American women archaeologists
Michigan Technological University alumni
University of Nevada, Reno alumni
Year of birth missing (living people)
21st-century American women